Chalcosyrphus amurensis is a species of hoverfly in the family Syrphidae.

Distribution
Russia.

References

Eristalinae
Insects described in 1925
Diptera of Asia
Taxa named by Aleksandr Stackelberg